Ashish Shelar (born 3 October 1972) is an Indian politician and cricket administrator belonging to Bharatiya Janata Party. He served as Maharashtra Legislative Assembly member representing Vandre West since 2014. He was president of the Mumbai unit of the BJP.

He was elected as vice president of Mumbai Cricket Association on 17 June 2015.

On 9 September 2015, Shelar gained controversy when he helped ban the sale of meat for 8 days for the annual Jain celebration, Paryushana, at which time total fast from any and every food is required. Most constituencies in Maharashtra ban the sale of meat for only 4 days. The ban was criticized by the BJP's Maharashtra coalition partner, Shiv Sena.

Education and early career
Shelar graduated from Parle College with a Bachelor of Science (B.Sc.) degree in 1992. He then completed a three-year law degree from G. J. Advani Law College, at the University of Mumbai.

A native from Sindhudurg district of Konkan, Ashish was born in chawl system dwelling of mill-workers area. Later in his childhood he shifted and settled in Bandra West with his parents and family. He joined RSS in school days and completed Prathamik Varsha course. He went on to join ABVP in college and successfully rose to the leading position of Mumbai Secretary of ABVP.

Family and personal life
Ashish Shelar is married to advocate Pratima Shelar (née Dalvi).

Sports administration

 Elected Mumbai Cricket Association member in June 2015.
 Chairman of Mumbai district football association representing Mumbai's 350 football clubs.
 Vice President of the Rajasthan Sports Club.
 Elected Mumbai Cricket Association President on 12 January 2017.

Positions held

Within BJP 

 Mumbai Secretary, ABVP
 President, Mumbai BJYM
 Core team, organising committee, BJP Maha Adhiveshan, 1995
 BMC Corporator, Khar West
 President, North West Mumbai district BJP 
 BMC Corporator, BJP Group Leader in BMC
 MMRDA member
 Governor of Mumbai Metro heritage society.
 Currently President Bharatiya Janata Party, Mumbai.

Legislative 

Member, Maharashtra Legislative Council, 28 July 2012 – 27 July 2014
Member, Maharashtra Legislative Assembly, Since 2014

References

People from Bandra
Living people
1972 births
Maharashtra MLAs 2014–2019
Members of the Maharashtra Legislative Council
People from Sindhudurg district
Marathi politicians